Wallis W. Brooks is a former Republican member of the Pennsylvania House of Representatives. She graduated from American University with a degree in English in 1969. She earned a law degree from the Dickinson School of Law, and was admitted to the Pennsylvania bar in 1973.

Election history

References

External links
State Representative Wallis Brooks official PA House profile (archived)

Living people
Republican Party members of the Pennsylvania House of Representatives
Women state legislators in Pennsylvania
Year of birth missing (living people)
21st-century American women